Palavakkam is a village located in Ellapuram block, Uthukottai taluk of Tiruvallur District, India.

The village has three schools: Govt Primary school, Govt Higher Secondary School and Sri Lakshmi Matriculation Higher Secondary School.

The village is bordered by two lakes of Palavakkam and Lachivakkam. The economy revolves around agriculture.  The people speak Tamil and Telugu. The village has a mosque, two churches and five temples.

References

Villages in Tiruvallur district